Bhaluee (also known as Bhalui) is a village in Lakhisarai district, Bihar, India.

Villages in Lakhisarai district